Koča Pavlović (Montenegrin Cyrillic: Коча Павловић; 17 September 1962 – 19 September 2019) was a Montenegrin journalist and politician.

Career
He made a career in journalism as a political talk-show host and chief editor of NTV Montena and TV Budva television networks, and director of "War for Peace", the first Montenegrin documentary about the involvement of the Montenegrin army in the Civil War in Yugoslavia and the Siege of Dubrovnik. The movie sparked great controversies in Montenegro.

Pavlović was a founding member of a non-governmental organization Group for Changes, which was transformed into a political party in 2006. Since the elections in 2006, the Movement for Changes (PzP) has established itself as one of the strongest parliamentary opposition parties in the country, Koča Pavlović served as a Member of Parliament for PzP and as the party's spokesman. Following the 2009, 2012 and 2016 elections Pavlović served in the Parliament of Montenegro as an opposition MP for the Movement for Changes.

See also
Movement for Changes
Democratic Front

References

1962 births
2019 deaths
People from Žabljak
Movement for Changes politicians
Montenegrin journalists
Male journalists
Members of the Parliament of Montenegro